The Sea Cliff Bridge, together with the adjoining Lawrence Hargrave Drive Bridge, are two road bridges that carry the scenic Lawrence Hargrave Drive across the rockface on the Illawarra escarpment, located in the northern Illawarra region of New South Wales, Australia. The balanced cantilever and incremental launching girder bridges link the coastal villages of Coalcliff and Clifton and carry two lanes of traffic, and a pedestrian walkway.

The Sea Cliff Bridge was named by Makenzie Russell, who at the time was an eleven-year-old student, following a naming competition opened to local primary school students. The Lawrence Hargrave Drive Bridge and the Lawrence Hargrave Drive are named in honour of Lawrence Hargrave, an Australian engineer, explorer, astronomer, inventor and aeronautical pioneer.

History 
The Sea Cliff Bridge replaced a section of Lawrence Hargrave Drive that was permanently closed in August 2003 due to regular rock falls. A public outcry emerged over the road closure as Lawrence Hargrave Drive is the only road directly linking Coalcliff, Stanwell Park, Otford and Helensburgh to the northern suburbs of Wollongong.

Description 
Completed in 2005, the Sea Cliff Bridge structure comprises a haunched box girder composed of prestressed concrete that was constructed using the balanced cantilever method, with five spans. Adjoining the Sea Cliff Bridge is the  Lawrence Hargrave Drive Bridge often not considered as two separate bridges.

Cyclists are allowed to use the traffic lanes and there are shoulders on either side of the road of approximately 1.2 metres (4 ft) width.

The bridges were officially opened by the NSW Premier Morris Iemma on 11 December 2005, and were met with public approval and increased business for the area's tourism industry.

The bridges sit in a harsh marine environment as it directly faces the open ocean and is affected by high sea swell splashing. It is well attested that concrete structures in such environments are especially susceptible to chloride induced corrosion of the steel reinforcement, which can eventually lead to expensive repair works and significantly decrease the life of the structure.

Tourism 
An hour south of Sydney, the bridges have been a major tourist spot since they opened in 2005. The area adjacent to the bridges feature a scenic walkway surrounded by rocky cliffs that is a popular location for love padlocks.

Pioneer Walks published the route to the lookout and encouraged spectators to participate in an "unofficial walk with no safety precautions in place". On 30 September 2018, a 24-year-old man hiked to the “lookout" atop the cliff overlooking the bridges, where he sat down to take a rest. The ground he sat on was loose, and he slid  to the cliff’s edge, where he then plummeted  to his death.

In popular media 
The Sea Cliff Bridge and adjoining Lawrence Hargrave Drive Bridge were featured in a range of media including:
 a joint 2007 Ferrari/Shell television advertisement that was shown in Australia and many other countries.
 a VE Holden Commodore commercial
 the video game, Forza Horizon 3, where players can race over the bridge
in Guy Sebastian's music video for the song 'Choir', where he is seen walking under the Sea Cliff Bridge

Gallery

See also

 List of bridges in Australia
Bald Hill, a nearby lookout spot

References

External links

 Sea Cliff Bridge Webcam
 Sea Cliff Bridge website
 Grand Pacific Drive
   Lawrence Hargrave Drive reopens Roads & Traffic Authority
 Northern Illawarra Online - Community Web Portal
 HangglideOz - tandems and lic courses

2005 establishments in Australia
Wollongong
Bridges completed in 2005
Tourist attractions in Wollongong
Cantilever bridges
Road bridges in New South Wales
Concrete bridges in Australia
Box girder bridges